The 2017 South Dakota State Jackrabbits football team represented South Dakota State University in the 2017 NCAA Division I FCS football season. They were led by 21st-year head coach John Stiegelmeier and played their home games at Dana J. Dykhouse Stadium in Brookings, South Dakota as members of the Missouri Valley Football Conference. The Jackrabbits finished the season 11–3, 6–2 in MVFC play to finish in a tie for second place. They received an at-large bid to the FCS Playoffs where they defeated Northern Iowa in the second round and New Hampshire in the quarterfinals before losing in the semifinals to James Madison.

Previous season 
The Jackrabbits finished the 2016 season 9–4, 7–1 in MVFC play to earn a share of the MVFC title. Due to their head-to-head victory over North Dakota State, they received the MVFC's automatic bid to the FCS playoffs where they defeated Villanova in the second round before losing in the quarterfinals to North Dakota State.

Schedule and results

Source:

Ranking movements

Jackrabbits drafted

References

South Dakota State
South Dakota State Jackrabbits football seasons
South Dakota State
South Dakota State Jackrabbits football